Terjärv was an independent municipality of Finland until 1969 but is now together with Nedervetil, a part of the municipality of Kronoby.

Terjärv is located in the province of Western Finland and is part of the Ostrobothnia region. The ex-municipality has a population of about 2,400.

The former municipality is bilingual, with a large majority Swedish-speaking and the minority Finnish. Being  by air from port city Jakobstad at the nearest coastline, the village is among the further inland settlements of Swedish-speaking Finland. Terjärv is known as 'The Pearl Of Ostrobothnia' for the exceptionally nice nature for the region, with rolling hills and numerous lakes along the river running through Terjärv.

Kokkola-Pietarsaari Airport is located in Kronoby close to Terjärv.

Villages in Terjärv 

 Terjärv have 3 main villages; Kyrkoby, Hästbacka, and Kortjärv. Inside these main villages are smaller villages. The largest of these is Småbönders in the southeast. Others are Högnabba, Djupsjöbacka, Kortjärvi, Dövnäs, Kolam, Emet and Drycksbäck. 
There are also places like Särs-Backman or Skogsbyn, Klubbi, Granö, Skullbacka, Nabba, Sågslamp, Kaitås, Emas, Lotas, Peckas, Sandvik, Grannabba, Långbacka, Lytz, Vistä, Furu, Svartsjö, Myngels, Manderbacka, that cannot be called villages but are boroughs of some of the main villages.

Villages 
 :sv:Djupsjöbacka
 :sv:Högnabba
 :sv:Kortjärvi
 :sv:Småbönders

References

Former municipalities of Finland
Geography of Ostrobothnia (region)